The 2021 Wimbledon Championships's order of play for main draw matches on the center court and outside courts, starting from June 28 until July 11.

All dates are BST (UTC+1).

Day 1 (28 June) 
Seeds out:
 Gentlemen's Singles:  Stefanos Tsitsipas [3],  Jannik Sinner [19],  Nikoloz Basilashvili [24],  Reilly Opelka [27],  Alejandro Davidovich Fokina [30] 
 Ladies' Singles:  Petra Kvitová [10],  Veronika Kudermetova [29]
Schedule of play

Day 2 (29 June) 
Seeds out:
 Gentlemen's Singles:  Alex de Minaur [15]
 Ladies' Singles:  Serena Williams [6],  Kiki Bertens [17],  Alison Riske [28]
Schedule of play

Day 3 (30 June) 
Seeds out:
 Gentlemen's Singles:  Pablo Carreño Busta [11],  Casper Ruud [12],  Aslan Karatsev [20],  Ugo Humbert [21],  John Isner [28]
 Ladies' Singles:  Sofia Kenin [4],  Bianca Andreescu [5],  Belinda Bencic [9],  Jessica Pegula [22],  Anett Kontaveit [24],  Petra Martić [26],  Ekaterina Alexandrova [32]
Schedule of play

Day 4 (1 July) 
Seeds out:
 Gentlemen's Singles:  Gaël Monfils [13],  Grigor Dimitrov [18]
 Ladies' Singles:  Elina Svitolina [3],  Victoria Azarenka [12],  Maria Sakkari [15],  Daria Kasatkina [31]
 Gentlemen's Doubles:  Wesley Koolhof /  Jean-Julien Rojer [10],  Tim Pütz /  Michael Venus [12],  Sander Gillé /  Joran Vliegen [13]
 Ladies' Doubles:  Tímea Babos /  Kristina Mladenovic [2],  Alexa Guarachi /  Desirae Krawczyk [6],  Hayley Carter /  Luisa Stefani [8],  Darija Jurak /  Andreja Klepač [10]
Schedule of play

Day 5 (2 July) 
Seeds out:
 Gentlemen's Singles:  Diego Schwartzman [9],  Dan Evans [22],  Fabio Fognini [26]
 Ladies' Singles:  Garbiñe Muguruza [11],  Elise Mertens [13] 
 Gentlemen's Doubles:  Kevin Krawietz /  Horia Tecău [9]
 Ladies' Doubles:  Nicole Melichar /  Demi Schuurs [4]
Schedule of play

Day 6 (3 July) 
Seeds out:
 Gentlemen's Singles:  Cameron Norrie [29],  Taylor Fritz [31],  Marin Čilić [32]
 Ladies' Singles:  Anastasia Pavlyuchenkova [16]
 Gentlemen's Doubles:  Pierre-Hugues Herbert /  Nicolas Mahut [2],  Ivan Dodig /  Filip Polášek [5],  Jamie Murray /  Bruno Soares [7],  Henri Kontinen /  Édouard Roger-Vasselin [11],  Marcus Daniell /  Philipp Oswald [15]
 Mixed Doubles:  Michael Venus /  Chan Hao-ching [8]
Schedule of play

Middle Sunday (4 July) 
As is tradition, Middle Sunday is a day of rest and no matches are played.

Day 7 (5 July) 
Seeds out:
 Gentlemen's Singles:  Alexander Zverev [4],  Andrey Rublev [5],  Roberto Bautista Agut [8],  Cristian Garín [17],  Lorenzo Sonego [23]
 Ladies' Singles:  Iga Świątek [7],  Barbora Krejčíková [14],  Elena Rybakina [18],  Coco Gauff [20],  Madison Keys [23],  Paula Badosa [30]
 Men's Doubles:  Max Purcell /  Luke Saville [16]
 Ladies' Doubles:  Sharon Fichman /  Giuliana Olmos [9],  Laura Siegemund /  Vera Zvonareva [11],  Nadiia Kichenok /  Raluca Olaru [13],  Asia Muhammad /  Jessica Pegula [14]
 Mixed Doubles:  Ben McLachlan /  Ena Shibahara [15]
Schedule of play

Day 8 (6 July) 
Seeds out:
 Gentlemen's Singles:  Daniil Medvedev [2]
 Ladies' Singles:  Karolína Muchová [19],  Ons Jabeur [21]
 Gentlemen's Doubles:  Łukasz Kubot /  Marcelo Melo [8]
 Ladies' Doubles:  Coco Gauff /  Caty McNally [12],  Viktória Kužmová /  Arantxa Rus [15]
 Mixed Doubles:  Wesley Koolhof /  Demi Schuurs [3],  Rajeev Ram /  Bethanie Mattek-Sands [5],  Fabrice Martin /  Alexa Guarachi [12]
Schedule of play

Day 9 (7 July) 
Seeds out:
 Gentlemen's Singles:  Roger Federer [6],  Félix Auger-Aliassime [16],  Karen Khachanov [25] 
 Gentlemen's Doubles:  Juan Sebastián Cabal /  Robert Farah [3],  Raven Klaasen /  Ben McLachlan [14]
 Ladies' Doubles:  Barbora Krejčíková /  Kateřina Siniaková [1],  Chan Hao-ching /  Latisha Chan [7],  Marie Bouzková [16] /  Lucie Hradecká [16]
 Mixed Doubles:  Ivan Dodig /  Latisha Chan [6],  Raven Klaasen /  Darija Jurak [10],  Sander Gillé /  Hayley Carter [13]
Schedule of play

Day 10 (8 July) 
Seeds out:
 Ladies' Singles:  Aryna Sabalenka [2],  Angelique Kerber [25]
 Gentlemen's Doubles:  Rajeev Ram [6] /  Joe Salisbury [6]
 Mixed Doubles:  Mate Pavić /  Gabriela Dabrowski [2],  Édouard Roger-Vasselin /  Nicole Melichar [4],  Jean-Julien Rojer /  Andreja Klepač [14]
Schedule of play

Day 11 (9 July) 
Seeds out:
 Gentlemen's Singles:  Denis Shapovalov [10],  Hubert Hurkacz [14]
 Ladies' Doubles:  Shuko Aoyama /  Ena Shibahara [5]
 Mixed Doubles:  Kevin Krawietz /  Kveta Peschke [9]
Schedule of play

{| class="wikitable collapsible uncollapsed" style="margin:auto;"
! colspan="4" style="white-space:nowrap;" | Matches on main courts
|-
! colspan="4" |Matches on Centre Court
|-
! width="250" |Event
! width="220" |Winner
! width="220" |Loser
! width="250" |Score
|-
|Gentlemen's Singles Semifinals
| Matteo Berrettini [7]
| Hubert Hurkacz [14]
|6–3, 6–0, 6–7(3–7), 6–4
|-
|Gentlemen's Singles Semifinals
| Novak Djokovic [1]''
| Denis Shapovalov [10]
|7–6(7–3), 7–5, 7–5
|-
|Mixed Doubles Semifinals
| Joe Salisbury Harriet Dart| Kevin Krawietz [9] Kveta Peschke [9]
|6–2, 4–6, 6–4
|-
! colspan="4" |Matches on No. 1 Court
|-
! width="250" |Event
! width="220" |Winner
! width="220" |Loser
! width="250" |Score
|-
|Ladies' Doubles Semifinals
| Hsieh Su-Wei [3] Elise Mertens [3]| Shuko Aoyama [5] Ena Shibahara [5]
|6–4, 1–6, 6–3
|-
|Ladies' Doubles Semifinals
| Veronika Kudermetova Elena Vesnina| Caroline Dolehide Storm Sanders
|7–6(8–6), 3–6, 7–5
|-
|Boys' Singles Quarterfinals
| Juncheng Shang [1]| Jerome Kym [11]
|3–6, 7–6(7–2), 6–4
|-
! colspan="4" |Matches on No. 3 Court
|-
! width="220" |Event
! width="220" |Winner
! width="220" |Loser
! width="250" |Score
|-
|Boys' Singles Third Round
| Jack Pinnington Jones [7]| Kalin Ivanovski
|7–5, 6–0
|-
|Girls' Singles Quarterfinals
|
| Alicia Dudeney [WC]
|3–6, 6–2, 6–1
|-
|Boys' Singles Quarterfinals
|
| Bruno Kuzuhara [4]
|6–7(5–7), 6–4, 6–2
|-
|Boys' Singles Quarterfinals
| Victor Lilov| Jack Pinnington Jones [7]
|4–6, 6–4, 6–3
|-
|}

 Day 12 (10 July) Seeds out:
 Ladies' Singles:  Karolína Plíšková [8] 
 Gentlemen's Doubles:  Marcel Granollers /  Horacio Zeballos [4]
Mixed Doubles:  John Peers /  Shuai Zhang [17]
Schedule of play

 Day 13 (11 July) Seeds out''':
 Gentlemen's Singles:  Matteo Berrettini [7]
Schedule of play

References

2021 Wimbledon Championships
Wimbledon Championships by year – Day-by-day summaries